Cybergirl is an Australian-French children's television series that first screened on Network Ten in Australia. The 26-episode series was created by Jonathan M. Shiff, whose previous series include the BAFTA-award-winning Ocean Girl.

Plot
Cybergirl is a Blue superheroine Human Prototype 6000 living under the secret identity of ordinary teenage girl Ashley Campbell. In reality, she is a "Human Prototype 6000" from a distant planet.

Her powers include super-human strength, super-human speed, and the ability to interface directly with electronic devices and computers; she is also able to physically change her appearance between that of the blue-haired, ethereal-looking Cybergirl and the less conspicuous, mousy-haired Ashley, and can alter her clothing at will.

She was originally known as the Cyber Replicant Human Prototype 6000, the only one of her model to be built. Not only are her powers far and above that of earlier models, she has a much wider emotional scope than her predecessors. She ran away from her planet of origin in order to explore the beings she was modeled after, namely humans.

Two other Evil Red Replicants called Isaac and Xanda are sent after her and their sole mission is to destroy her. She lands on Earth in the fictional city of River City, Australia which is modeled on and filmed in Brisbane. She meets Jackson and Hugh Campbell, who take her in, and she adopts the name Cybergirl as her superheroine identity. Jackson calls her "Cy" and she later uses her powers to make herself look more human; this identity is called Ashley, in which she poses as Jackson's cousin and Hugh's niece. The only other person besides Hugh and Jackson to know her identity is Kat, her friend and neighbour.

She is pursued not only by Xanda and Isaac but also by a powerful software mogul named Rhyss. She is well loved by the populace of River City, however, and she enjoys the approval of Mayor Buxton, whose twin daughters Emerald and Sapphire are big fans of the superheroine. Ironically they snub her, as Ashley, at school.

Cast

Main
Ania Stepien as Ashley Campbell / Cybergirl
Craig Horner as Jackson Campbell
Mark Owen-Taylor as Hugh Campbell
Jennifer Congram as Xanda
Ric Anderson as Isaac
Septimus Caton as Rhyss
Winston Cooper as Giorgio
Peter Mochrie as Rick Fontaine
Jovita Shaw as Kat Fontaine

Recurring
Christine Amor as Mayor Burdette Buxton
David Vallon as Romirez
Michelle Atkinson as Anthea
Jessica Origliasso as Emerald Buxton
Lisa Origliasso as Sapphire Buxton
Tony Hawkins as McMurtrie

Guest
John Dommett as Mr. Southerly
Jason Klarwein as Sales Assistant
Daniel Amalm as Marco
Julie Eckersley as Julia
Damien Garvey as Paramedic
Remi Broadway as Zak Furnace

Episodes

DVD release
Cybergirl was released on DVD on 4 December 2006 as CyberGirl: The Superhero for a New Generation – The Complete Series. The set includes all 26 episodes on 4 DVDs and is Region 0. The release includes making of/behind-the-scenes featurettes created from a period Electronic Press Kit and the packaging makes frequent references to the fact that the series features "before they were famous" appearances by The Veronicas.

See also 
 Naagin

External links 
 Cybergirl at the Australian Television Information Archive
 Jonathan M. Shiff Productions - the official website for Jonathan M. Shiff productions, has a Cybergirl section
 
Cybergirl at the National Film and Sound Archive

Network 10 original programming
English-language television shows
Fictional computers
Australian adventure television series
Australian children's television series
Australian science fiction television series
French adventure television series
French children's television series
French science fiction television series
Television shows set in Queensland
2001 Australian television series debuts
2002 Australian television series endings
2001 French television series debuts
2002 French television series endings
Cyborgs in television
Malware in fiction
Child superheroes
Television series about television
Cyberpunk television series
Television series about teenagers
Television shows filmed in Australia
Teen superhero television series